Magnolia Park is a county park located on the eastern shore of Lake Apopka. It is managed by the Orange County Parks and Recreation.

History
The land for Magnolia Park was deeded to Orange County in 1962.

Recreation
Magnolia Park contains picnic tables, playgrounds, volleyball courts, basketball courts, baseball fields, a boat ramp, 18 RV/tent campsites, and 2 group campsites. A trailhead for the Lake Apopka Loop Trail is located on the northwest side of the park.

Wildlife
Magnolia Park is home to about a dozen peacocks, which have been known to be aggressive at times.
Sandhill Cranes, Osprey, Turkey Vultures, American Alligators, and numerous other animals are also regularly spotted at the park.

Access and hours of operation
Magnolia Park is located at 2929 S Binion RD, Apopka, FL 32703. It is open daily, from 8:00am – 8:00pm in the summer, and 8:00am – 6:00pm in the winter.

References

Parks in Orange County, Florida